modprobe is a Linux program originally written by Rusty Russell and used to add a loadable kernel module to the Linux kernel or to remove a loadable kernel module from the kernel. It is commonly used indirectly: udev relies upon modprobe to load drivers for automatically detected hardware.

Modprobe is distributed as part of the software package "kmod" (maintained by Lucas De Marchi and others). It was previously developed as:
 "module-init-tools", for Linux kernel version 2.6 and later (maintained by Jon Masters and others)
 "modutils" for use with Linux versions 2.2.x and 2.4.x. .

Operation 
The  program offers more full-featured "Swiss-army-knife" features than the more basic  and  utilities, with the following benefits:

 An ability to make more intuitive decisions about which modules to load
 awareness of module dependencies, so that when requested to load a module,  adds other required modules first
 the resolution of recursive module dependencies as required

If invoked with no switches, the program by default adds/inserts/installs the named module into the kernel.
Root privileges are typically required for these changes.

Any arguments appearing after the module name are passed to the kernel (in addition to any options listed in the configuration file).

In some versions of modprobe, the configuration file is called modprobe.conf, and in others, the equivalent is the collection of files called <modulename> in the /etc/modprobe.d directory.

modprobe looks only in the standard module directories, to install modules from the working directory insmod is still required. The user can also make a symbolic link of the module to the standard path, so depmod will find and load it like any other installed module.

Features 
The  program also has more configuration features than other similar utilities. It is possible to define module aliases allowing for some automatic loading of modules. When the kernel requires a module, it actually runs modprobe to request it; however, the kernel has a description of only some module properties (for example, a device major number, or the number of a network protocol), and modprobe does the job of translating that to an actual module name via aliases.

This program also has the ability to run programs before or after loading or unloading a given module; for example, setting the mixer right after loading a sound card module, or uploading the firmware to a device immediately prior to enabling it. Although these actions must be implemented by external programs, modprobe takes care of synchronizing their execution with module loading/unloading.

Blacklist 
There are cases where two or more modules both support the same devices, or a module invalidly claims to support a device: the blacklist keyword indicates that all of a particular module's internal aliases are to be ignored.

There are a couple of ways to blacklist a module, and depending on the method used to load it depends on where this is configured.

There are two ways to blacklist a module using modprobe, employing the modprobe.conf system, the first is to use its blacklisting system in /etc/modprobe.d/. Any filename ending with .conf can be used:

 cat /etc/modprobe.d/blacklist.conf
 blacklist ieee1394
 blacklist ohci1394
 blacklist eth1394
 blacklist sbp2

An install primitive is the highest priority in the config file and will be used instead of the blacklisting method above, requiring this second method:

 cat /etc/modprobe.d/ieee1394.conf
 install ieee1394 /bin/true
 install ohci1394 /bin/true
 install eth1394 /bin/true
 install sbp2 /bin/true

Alternately, you can modify /etc/modprobe.conf:

 alias sub_module /dev/null 
 alias module_main /dev/null 
 options module_main needed_option=0

See also 
 lsmod

References

External links 
 modprobe man page.
 modprobe.conf
 modules.dep

Command-line software
Linux kernel-related software